Radvaň nad Laborcom is a village and municipality in the Medzilaborce District in the Prešov Region of far north-eastern Slovakia, in the Laborec Highlands.

History
In historical records the village was first mentioned in 1440.

Geography
The municipality lies at an altitude of 226 metres and covers an area of 20.138 km². It has a population of about 585 people.

References

External links
 
 
http://www.statistics.sk/mosmis/eng/run.html

Villages and municipalities in Medzilaborce District